The women's 5000 metres event at the 2016 IAAF World U20 Championships was held at Zdzisław Krzyszkowiak Stadium on 23 July.

Medalists

Records

Results

References

5000 metres
Long distance running at the World Athletics U20 Championships